İsmail Haktan Odabaşı (born 7 August 1991) is a Turkish professional footballer who plays as a right winger for 1461 Trabzon.

Life and career
Odabaşı signed a youth contract with Balçovaspor in 2005. He was transferred to Bursaspor in 2007. As a player for Bursaspor A2, Odabaşı has scored 18 goals in 67 matches. He made his professional debut on 10 March 2010 against Kasımpaşa S.K. in the Süper Lig. Odabaşı featured in six more matches during the 2009–10 campaign, and was a part of the Bursaspor squad that won the 2009–10 Süper Lig.

Odabaşı has played internationally for the Turkey U-16, U-17, and U-19 squads. In 2009, he helped the U-19 squad qualify for the Elite Round of the 2009 UEFA European Under-19 Football Championship, scoring a goal against Germany in the final group stage match. The team progressed past the Elite Round, but finished last place in Group B of the finals.

Honours 
 Bursaspor
Süper Lig (1): 2009–10

References

External links

1991 births
People from Konak
Living people
Turkish footballers
Turkey youth international footballers
Turkey under-21 international footballers
Turkey B international footballers
Association football wingers
Bursaspor footballers
Denizlispor footballers
Şanlıurfaspor footballers
Boluspor footballers
Gaziantepspor footballers
Giresunspor footballers
Manisaspor footballers
Manisa FK footballers
Tuzlaspor players
Menemenspor footballers
1461 Trabzon footballers
Süper Lig players
TFF First League players
TFF Second League players